Gary D. Hanson is a Democratic member of the South Dakota Senate, representing the 1st district from 2004 to 2010. Previously he was a member of the South Dakota House of Representatives from 1998 through 2004.

External links
South Dakota Legislature – Gary Hanson official SD Senate website

Project Vote Smart – Senator Gary D. Hanson (SD) profile
Follow the Money – Gary D Hanson
2008 2006 2004 Senate campaign contributions
2002 2000 House campaign contributions

South Dakota state senators
Members of the South Dakota House of Representatives
People from Sisseton, South Dakota
1949 births
Living people
Farmers from South Dakota
Ranchers from South Dakota